Cyperus decompositus is a species of sedge that is endemic to north eastern Australia.

The species was first formally described by the botanist Robert Brown in 1810 as Mariscus decompositus, then reclassified by Ferdinand von Mueller in 1874 as a part of the work Fragmenta Phytographiae Australiae.

The range of the plant extends from the Northern Territory in the west to Queensland in the east from sea level to an altitude of  usually as a part of rain forest, open forest or forest communities.

See also
 List of Cyperus species

References

decompositus
Taxa named by Ferdinand von Mueller
Plants described in 1874
Flora of Queensland
Flora of the Northern Territory